The Fort Knox Gold Mine is an open pit gold mine,  east of Fox in the Fairbanks mining district of Alaska. It is owned and operated by Toronto-based Kinross Gold. Originally staked in 1913, after very minor mining at the location the property sat idle until being restaked in 1980. Following the initial exploration discovery in 1987, in 1992 the project was purchased by Amax Gold, which brought the mine to production. Amax Gold merged with Kinross Gold in 1998.

History
The land that the Fort Knox mine sits on was originally staked in 1913 when a bismuth-bearing, gold-quartz vein was located. Minor mining occurred with a small shaft and a three-head stamp mill. There had been placer mining in the area as early as 1903 and in 1980 local prospectors Joe Taylor and George Johnson worked the placer deposits. In 1986, the property was leased to various mining companies. In 1992, Amax Gold purchased the property. Construction began 1995 with the first gold pour at the end of 1996. In 1998, Amax Gold merged with Kinross Gold.

Geology
The Fort Knox gold is hosted by a late-Cretaceous granite pluton that intruded into the surrounding Fairbanks Schist.  The pluton is described as "a light gray, fine grained granodiorite, medium grained biotite granite, and coarse grained, biotite granite porphyry, which form blocky bedrock exposures". Gold, bismuth and tellurium minerals occur in pegmatite and quartz veins and fractures within the pluton. The sulfide content is very low (<0.1%).

The Fort Knox gold deposit had pre-production Proven and Probable Reserves in 1996 of 158.3 million tonnes @ 0.83 g/t gold with a 0.39 g/t gold cut-off for 4.2 million ounces. After the production of over 7.5 million ounces, at 31 December 2019 Proven and Probable Reserves were 255.8 million tonnes @ 0.3 g/t gold for 2.80 million ounces.

Description
From 2001–2004, the True North Mine, a small satellite deposit was operated and the ore was processed through the Fort Knox mill. Surpassing 7 million ounces in 2016, Fort Knox is the largest producer of gold in the history of the state of Alaska. The  mine's life is expected to extend to 2027 following a $100 million expansion investment announced in 2018, increasing life-of-mine production by about 1.5 million gold equivalent ounces.

Mining & milling

Due to its very low sulfide content, waste rock from Fort Knox does not produce acid mine drainage. The mill consists of a gyratory crusher, a 34' x 15' semi-autogenous grinding mill, two 20' x 30' ball mills, and a gravity separation circuit with a Knelson concentrator. Gold not recovered by the Knelson concentrator is sent through the CIL circuit.

In 2009, a valley-fill heap leaching operation came on line. Lower grade ore is trucked to the facility from the mine.

See also
Red Dog mine

References

Buildings and structures in Fairbanks North Star Borough, Alaska
Gold mines in the United States
Kinross Gold
Mines in Alaska
Open-pit mines
Surface mines in the United States